Full Stretch is a British comedy television series which first aired on ITV in 1993. It portrays a limousine rental company owned by an ex-footballer.

David Bowie has a cameo as himself in one episode.

Main cast
 Kevin McNally as  Baz Levick (6 episodes)
 Reece Dinsdale as Tarquin Woods (6 episodes)
 Sue Johnston as Grace Robbins (6 episodes)
 Wendy Morgan as Tanya Levick (6 episodes)
 Rowena King as  Tessa Knowles (6 episodes)
 David Howey as Norman Love (6 episodes)
 Tilly Vosburgh as Jools Legge (6 episodes)
 Clarence Smith as Darryl Judd (5 episodes)
 Dickon Tolson as Teejay (4 episodes)
 James Aubrey as Morris Legge (3 episodes)

References

Bibliography
 Horace Newcomb. Encyclopedia of Television. Routledge, 2014.

External links
 

ITV sitcoms
1993 British television series debuts
1993 British television series endings
1990s British comedy television series
English-language television shows